Hudson High School is a public high school in Hudson, Michigan.  It is the only high school in the Hudson Area School district.  Their nickname is the Tigers.  They are members of the Lenawee County Athletic Association.

References

External links
 District Website

Schools in Lenawee County, Michigan
Public high schools in Michigan